The 36th National Assembly of Quebec was the provincial legislature in Quebec, Canada that was elected in the 1998 Quebec general election and sat from March 2, 1999, to March 9, 2001, and from March 22, 2001, to March 12, 2003. The Parti Québécois was the governing party with premiers Lucien Bouchard (November 1998 to January 2001) and Bernard Landry (January 2001 to April 2003).

Seats per political party

 After the 1998 elections

Member list

This was the list of members of the National Assembly of Quebec that were elected in the 1998 election:

Other elected MNAs

Other MNAs were elected in by-elections during this mandate

 Nathalie Rochefort, Quebec Liberal Party, Mercier, April 9, 2001 
 Richard Legendre, Parti Québécois, Blainville, October 1, 2001 
 Françoise Gauthier, Quebec Liberal Party, Jonquière, October 1, 2001 
 Sylvain Pagé, Parti Québécois, Labelle, October 1, 2001 
 Julie Boulet, Quebec Liberal Party, Laviolette, October 1, 2001 
 Lise Thériault, Quebec Liberal Party, Anjou, April 15, 2002 
 François Corriveau, Action démocratique du Québec, Saguenay, April 15, 2002,
 Anna Mancuso, Quebec Liberal Party, Viger, April 15, 2002 
 Marie Grégoire, Action démocratique du Québec, Berthier, June 17, 2002 
 Sylvie Lespérance, Action démocratique du Québec, Joliette, June 17, 2002 
 Stéphan Tremblay, Parti Québécois, Lac-Saint-Jean, June 17, 2002 
 François Gaudreau, Action démocratique du Québec, Vimont, June 17, 2002

Cabinet Ministers

Bouchard Cabinet (1998-2001)

 Prime Minister and Executive Council President: Lucien Bouchard
 Deputy Premier: Bernard Landry
 Agriculture, Fisheries and Food: Rémy Trudel
 Social Solidarity: André Boisclair
 Labor and Employment: Diane Lemieux
 President of the Treasury Board, Administration and Public Office: Jacques Léonard
 Information Highway and Government Services: David Cliche
 Culture and Communications:  Agnès Maltais
 International Relations: Louise Beaudoin
 Indian Affairs: Guy Cheverette
 Health and Social Services: Pauline Marois
 Health, Social Services and Youth Protection (Delegate): Gilles Baril
 Education and Youth (State Minister): François Legault
 Education: François Legault
 Family and Children: Pauline Marois, Nicole Léger (Delegate)
 Transportation: Guy Chevrette, Jacques Baril (Delegate)
 Canadian Intergovernmental Affairs: Joseph Facal
 Municipal Affairs and Metropole: Louise Harel
 Relations with the Citizens and Immigration: Robert Perreault (1998–2000), Sylvain Simard (2000–2001)
 Tourism: Maxime Arseneau
 Environment: Paul Bégin
 Natural Resources: Jacques Brassard
 Regions: Jean-Pierre Jolivet
 Justice: Linda Goupil
 Public Safety: Serge Ménard
 Finances: Bernard Landry
 Economy and Finances (State Minister): Bernard Landry
 Revenue: Rita Dionne-Marsolais (1998–1999), Bernard Landry (1999), Paul Bégin (1999–2001)
 Industry and Commerce: Bernard Landry, Guy Julien (Delegate)

Landry Cabinet (2001-2003)

 Prime Minister and Executive Council President: Bernard Landry
 Deputy Premier: Pauline Marois
 Agriculture, Fisheries and Food: Maxime Arseneau
 Employment and Social Solidarity: Jean Rochon (2001)
 Employment (Delegate): Agnès Maltais (2001)
 Social Solidarity: Jean Rochon (2001–2002), Linda Goupil (2002–2003)
 Labor, Employment and Social Solidarity (State Minister): Jean Rochon (2001–2003)
 Labor and Social Solidarity (State Minister): Jean Rochon (2001)
 Labor: Jean Rochon
 Human Resources and Labour (State Minister): Jean Rochon (2002–2003)
 President of the Treasury Board, Administration and Public Office: Sylvain Simard (2001–2002), Joseph Facal (2002–2003)
 Renewal of the Public Office (Secretary of State): Stéphane Bedard (2002–2003)
 Culture and Communications: Diane Lemieux
 International Relations: Louise Beaudoin
 Indian Affairs: Guy Cheverette (2001–2002), Rémy Trudel (2002), Michel Létourneau (2002–2003)
 Health and Social Services: Rémy Trudel (2001–2002), François Legault (2002–2003), David Levine (Delegate) (2002–2003)
 Health, Social Services and Youth Protection (Delegate): Agnès Maltais (2001–2002)
 Health, Social Services, Youth Protection and Rehabilitation: Roger Bertrand (2002–2003)
 Housing: Jacques Côté (2002–2003)
 Education and Youth (State Minister): François Legault
 Education and Employment (State Minister): François Legault (2001–2002), Sylvain Simard (2002–2003)
 Education: Francois Legault (2001–2002), Sylvain Simard (2002–2003)
 Family and Children: Linda Goupil
 Social Solidarity, Family and Children (State Minister): Linda Goupil (2002–2003)
 Fight Against Poverty and Discrimination: Nicole Léger
 Status of Women: Jocelyne Caron
 Transportation: Guy Chevrette (2001–2002), Serge Ménard (2002–2003)
 Transportation and Maritime Policies (Delegate): Jacques Baril
 Canadian Intergovernmental Affairs: Joseph Facal (2001–2002), Jean-Pierre Charbonneau (2002–2003)
 Municipal Affairs and Metropole: Louise Harel (2001–2002), André Boisclair (2002–2003)
 Municipal Infrastructures: Claude Boucher
 Capitale-Nationale: Rosaire Bertrand (2001–2003)
 Immigration Initiation and Integration (State Minister): André Boulerice
 Relations with the Citizens and Immigration: Joseph Facal (2001–2002), Rémy Trudel (2002–2003), André Boulerice (Delegate) (2002–2003)
 Democratic Institutions Reform: Jean-Pierre Charbonneau (2002–2003)
 Tourism, Recreation and Sport: Richard Legendre
 Environment: André Boisclair
 Environment and Water: André Boisclair (State Minister) (2001–2002), Jean-François Simard (2002–2003)
 Natural Resources: Jacques Brassard (2001–2002), Gilles Baril (2002), François Gendron (2002–2003), Rita Dionne-Marsolais (Delegate) (2001–2003)
 Natural Resources (State Minister): Gilles Baril (2002–2003)
 Energy: Rita Dionne-Marsolais: (2002–2003)
 Forest Management and Rural Regions: François Gendron (2002–2003)
 Regions: Gilles Baril (2001–2002), Remy Trudel (2002–2003)
 Resource Regions (Secretary of State: Lucie Papineau)
 Population and Indian Affairs:Remy Trudel (2002)
 Population, Regions and Indian Affairs (State Minister): Remy Trudel (2002–2003)
 Northern Quebec development: Michel Letourneau (2002–2003)
 Justice: Paul Bégin (2001–2002), Normand Jutras (2002–2003)
 Public Safety: Serge Ménard (2001–2002, 2002–2003), Normand Jutras (2002)
 Finances: Pauline Marois (2001–2002)
 Economy and Finances (State Minister): Pauline Marois (2001–2002)
 Industry and Commerce: Gilles Baril (2001–2002), Pauline Marois (2002), Lucie Papineau (Delegate) (2002–2003)
 Research, Science and Technology: Pauline Marois, David Cliche (Delegate), Solange Charest (Secretary of State) (2002–2003)
 Finances, Economy and Research: Pauline Marois (2002–2003)
 Revenue: Guy Julien

New electoral districts

An electoral map reform was made in 2001 and went into effect for the 2003 election.

The following electoral districts were created:
 Beauharnois
 Bourassa-Sauvé
 Huntingdon
 Jean-Lesage
 Jeanne-Mance–Viger
 Mirabel

The following electoral districts disappeared:
 Beauharnois-Huntingdon
 Bourassa
 Jeanne-Mance
 Limoilou
 Salaberry-Soulanges
 Sauvé

The following electoral district was renamed:
 Saguenay was renamed René-Lévesque; its territory was unchanged.

References
 1998 election results
 List of Historical Cabinet Ministers

Notes

36